In enzymology, a staphylopine synthase is an enzyme that catalyzes NADPH-dependent reductive condensation of pyruvate to the intermediate (2S)-2-amino-4-{[(1R)-1-carboxy-2-(1H-imidazol-4-yl)ethyl]amino}butanoate, which is the last step in the biosynthesis of the metallophore staphylopine.  The chemical reaction is:

H2O + NADP+ + staphylopine = (2S)-2-amino-4-{[(1R)-1-carboxy-2-(1H-imidazol-4-yl)ethyl]amino}butanoate + H+ + NADPH + pyruvate

Alternative name(s): staphylopine dehydrogenase.

References 

Enzymes